-s or -es may be:
in English
an ending used to form the regular English plural
an ending used to form the third-person singular present indicative of English verbs
these two forms differ slightly in their phonetic realization

a plural or other inflectional ending in certain other languages such as French, German, etc.

See also 
's (disambiguation)
S (disambiguation)

References 

English suffixes